The Hawks family (c.1750 – 1889) was one of the most powerful British industrial dynasties of the British Industrial Revolution. The Hawks owned several companies in Northern England and in the City of London (including Hawks and Co., Hawks, Crawshay, and Stanley, and Hawks, Crawshay and Sons) all of which had the name Hawks in the company name, and which had iron manufacture and engineering, which they exported worldwide using their own ships, as their main enterprises. The Hawks family were involved in merchant banking, and in freemasonry, and in Whig free-trade politics. They developed areas of West London, including Pembroke Square, Kensington.

The Hawks reached the apogee of their power during the Victorian period, when they employed over 2000 persons, when their reputation for engineering and bridge-building was worldwide. Their Gateshead factories were termed New Deptford and New Woolwich after the location of two of its warehouses on the River Thames, at Deptford and at Woolwich. The company built the High Level Bridge across the River Tyne that was opened by Queen Victoria in 1849; and numerous bridges including in Constantinople and India; and lighthouses in France; and ironclad warships and materials for the Royal Navy during the Napoleonic Wars; and large contracts for the East India Company. The Hawks produced the first iron boat, the Vulcan, in 1821. 

Notable members included Sir Robert Shafto Hawks (1768 - 1840); Joseph Hawks  (1791 - 1873), merchant banker and Sheriff of Newcastle; George Hawks (1801 - 1863), Grand Master of the Grand Cross Chapter of the Holy Temple of Jerusalem (Knights Templar); Mary Hawks (b. 1829), who was the wife of Richard Clement Moody, who was the founder of British Columbia; and Colonel Richard Stanley Hawks Moody CB (1854 - 1930), who was a distinguished British Army officer, and historian, and Military Knight of Windsor. 

The poet Joseph Skipsey worked for the Hawks' Gateshead ironworks, from 1859 to 1863, until one of his children was killed in an accident at the works in 1863. The job was obtained for Skipsey by the James Thomas Clephan, who was the editor of the Whig sympathetic Gateshead Observer.

Companies
The Hawks company was established by William Hawks (1708 – 1755), who worked for Sir Ambrose Crowley, Sheriff of London. In the late 1740s, Hawks established along the waste ground of the river at Gateshead a set of workshops which, when Hawks died (at Gateshead on 23 February 1755) were inherited by his eldest son, also William Hawks (bapt. 1730 - d. 1810), who, with his first wife, Elizabeth Dixon, established the Hawks' international industrial empire. William (d. 1810) in 1770 partnered with Thomas Longridge (bapt. 1751, d. 1803) and acquired a plating forge at Beamish, County Durham, which was the first of four separate metalworking sites operated by Hawks and Longridge along Beamish Burn. In the 1780s, a forge at Lumley, in County Durham, and slitting and rolling mills, on the River Blyth in  Northumberland, were acquired by the company.

By 1790, the works at Gateshead consisted of a substantial industrial complex that produced steel, anchors, heavy chains, steam-engine components, and a diversity of iron wares, that were supplied to the Board of Admiralty and were transported by the Gordon and Stanley families, the latter of whom were associated with the ordnance industry of the Weald and with the dockyards of the River Thames and of the Medway. The Hawks family also owned the Bedlington Ironworks during this period.

The Hawks Company built Hawks Cottages in the 1830s in the Saltmeadows district of Gateshead for its workers. 

On 4 December 1810, the estate of William Hawks was inherited by his surviving sons: George Hawks (1766 – 1820) of Blackheath, and Sir Robert Shafto Hawks (1768 – 1840), and John Hawks (1770 – 1830). The Hawks' factories covered 44 acres by the end of the 1830s, and employed between 800 and 900 people. At the time of the visit of the British Association to Newcastle in 1863, it employed 1500 people, and owned 92 marine engines and 58 land engines, which together provided 5000 horse power, and 33 puddling furnaces. The poet Joseph Skipsey worked for the Hawks' Gateshead ironworks, from 1859 to 1863, until one of his children was killed in an accident at the works in 1863. The job was obtained for Skipsey by the James Thomas Clephan, who was the editor of the Whig sympathetic Gateshead Observer. 

The Hawks' New Greenwich ironworks at Gateshead was Newcastle's largest employer until its closure when Hawks, Crawshay, and Sons was liquidated in 1889.

Specific Products

The Vulcan
The first iron boat to be built, which was a rowing boat that was named the Vulcan, was constructed, in 1821, at the Hawks's ironworks. When Sir Robert Shafto Hawks was informed of the purpose for which Samuel Tyne, the boat's inventor, had purchased iron from the Hawks company, he proffered for free the iron required for the task. Sir Robert arranged for cannons to be fired at the launch of the boat, which subsequently won races against wooden boats of the same capacity. However, on Ascension Day, 1826, when, laden with 12 persons including the rowers of the Vulcan, a boat that accompanied the Mayor's barge was hit by a steam vessel, two of the Vulcan's rowers were killed, and the Vulcan was subsequently abandoned.

Products
The Hawks company during about 1842 erected a cast-iron bridge at York, which spans the river Ouse in one arch of 172 feet in width. The company also reconstructed the Rowland Burdon iron bridge at Sunderland, Tyne and Wear, which consists of a single arch of a width of 237 feet. The company also constructed the wrought iron gates for the Northumberland Docks; and the iron lighthouses at Gunfleet, and at Harwich, and at Calais; and the iron pier at Madras. The company also built bridges in Constantinople. Sir Robert Hawks financed the construction of St John's Church, Gateshead Fell. The company built the High Level Bridge over the Tyne, which consisted of 5050 tons of iron, of which George Hawks drove in the last key on 7 June 1849, and which Queen Victoria opened later that year.  The company produced ironclad warships and other materials for the Royal Navy during the Napoleonic Wars,  and large contracts for the East India Company, and paddle steamers and hydraulic dredgers for use within Britain.

Property
The Hawks family developed also developed areas of London, including Pembroke Square, Kensington.

Notable members

Sir Robert Shafto Hawks (1768 - 1840)

Robert Shafto Hawks became the director of the Hawks company subsequent to the death of his father, and was knighted by the Prince Regent, in 1817, for his suppression of riots. Shafto Hawks was involved in freemasonry in which he served as Worshipful Master of the oldest lodge in Northumberland. Shafto Hawks is commemorated in Newcastle Cathedral, and with a portrait in Shipley Art Gallery. Sir Robert in 1790 married Hannah Pembroke Akenhead (1766 - 1863) by whom he had two sons: one of whom, William, entered the church; the other of whom, David, who was blind, was a musical prodigy who when aged 9 years composed published marches for military bands, and composed Tyrolean, and Scottish, and Welsh airs. David Hawks was said to have 'a most amazing proof of musical genius and early proficiency' when he was 17 years of age, and to be a 'true musical genius'.

George Hawks (1801 - 1863) 

Sir Robert's nephew George Hawks (1801 – 1863), of Redheugh Hall, succeeded Sir Robert as director of the Hawks company. George Hawks was a vehement supporter of Sir William Hutt MP, who was MP for Gateshead from 1841, and who campaigned to have George Hawks knighted. Redheugh Hall was one of the centres of Whiggism in the north east of England. George Hawks served as the first  Mayor of Gateshead in 1836, and, subsequently, in the same office again in 1848 and in 1849. George Hawks was extensively involved in freemasonry, in which he served as Grand Master of the Grand Cross Chapter of the Holy Temple of Jerusalem 
(Knights Templar), and as Past Master of the Lodge of Newcastle upon Tyne, and as Deputy of the Provincial Grand Lodge of Northumberland, and a Full Affiliated Member of The Celtic Lodge of Edinburgh and Leith No. 291. Hawks, who had been made a freemason in Guernsey, was described as 'an excellent mason'.

Joseph Hawks (1791 - 1873)

Joseph Stanley Hawks, of Jesmond House, Newcastle upon Tyne, was the son of George Hawks of Blackheath (1766 -1820), who was the brother of Sir Robert Shafto Hawks. Joseph Stanley Hawks was a merchant banker who served as Sheriff of Newcastle. He married Mary Elizabeth Boyd, who was the daughter of William Boyd of the Boyd merchant banking family which had founded the Bank of Newcastle, and who was the brother of the industrialist Edward Fenwick Boyd. William Boyd was a descendant of Sir Francis Liddell; and of Sir Thomas Liddell, 1st Baronet, (whose family governed the North of England in the 16th and 17th centuries); and of Frances or Francisca Forster (d. 1675) (who had been the wife of Nicholas Forster of Bamburgh Castle); and of Sir William Chaytor of Croft.

Mary Hawks (later Moody) (b. 1829)

Joseph's daughter, Mary Susannah Hawks, married Major-General Richard Clement Moody, who was the founder of British Columbia, by whom her children included Josephine 'Zeffie' Moody, who married Arthur Newall, who was the son of Robert Stirling Newall, who was a business associate of the Hawks family. Richard Clement Moody named the 400-foot hill in Port Coquitlam, "Mary Hill", after his wife Mary. The Royal British Columbia Museum possesses a trove of 42 letters that were written by Mary Moody from the Colony of British Columbia (1858–66) to her mother and to her sister, Emily Hawks, who were in England, that have been of interest to scholars of the ruling class of the British Empire.

Richard Stanley Hawks Moody (1854 - 1930)

Colonel Richard Stanley Hawks Moody  was a distinguished British Army officer, and historian, and Military Knight of Windsor.

Decline

Hannah, Lady Hawks (d. 1863), who was the widow of Sir Robert Shafto Hawks, and her two sons, sold their shares, in 1840, to George Crawshay, who was a member of a prominent iron-making family of south Wales, who had been bought out of his family's iron business in London by his brother William Crawshay II. The business of William Hawks was divided between his three eldest surviving sons in 1810. George Crawshay obtained a second third of the company when he acquired the shares of Joseph Hawks, who was the only surviving son of George Hawks of Blackheath. The Bedlington works were subsequently inherited by a cousin of the Hawks, Michael Longridge (1785 – 1853), who was a pioneer of railway technology, and who was an associate of Robert Stephenson, under whose superintendence they trained a generation of engineers including Sir Daniel Gooch, 1st Baronet.

The manager of Hawks, Crawshay and Sons during its last years was George Crawshay (1821 – 1896), who was the son of the elder George Crawshay. Like George Hawks, George Crawshay became sociopolitically influential, but, unlike George Hawks, Crawshay's management of the Hawks' company was incompetent: Crawshay failed to modernize the company, from manufacture of diverse products by diverse processes, to enable its successful competition with specialist companies, such as those owned by William Armstrong, 1st Baron Armstrong and by the nail manufacturer William Galloway, whose profits increased as those of Hawks and Crawshay declined until their liquidated their company in 1889, when all of its creditors were fully recompensed and its archive was destroyed.

References

Further reading

English families
People of the Industrial Revolution
Industrial history of England